Princess Nadejda Petrovna of Russia (Russian: Надежда Петровна; 3 March 1898 – 21 April 1988)  was the third child of Grand Duke Peter Nikolaevich of Russia and his wife, the former Princess Milica of Montenegro.

Marriages and children 

Nadejda was engaged before the outbreak of World War I to Prince Oleg Constantinovich of Russia, who was killed in action. She married Prince Nicholas Vladimirovich Orlov (1891–1961) in the Crimea in April 1917. They were among the Romanovs who escaped the Russian Revolution in 1919 aboard the British ship . Their baby daughter Princess Irina Orlova, born in March 1918, was the youngest passenger aboard the ship.

The Orlovs had two daughters:
 Princess Irina Nikolaïevna Orlova (1 March 1918 – 16 September 1989); married 1st in Rome 27 March 1940 (divorced 1946) Baron Hans von Waldstätten (1918–1977); m. 2nd in The Hague 8 January 1960 Anthony Adam Zylstra (1902–1982) 
 Princess Xenia Nikolaievna Orlova (27 March 1921 – 17 August 1963); married 1st in Avon 27 March 1940 (divorced 1950) Paul-Marcel de Montaignac de Pessotte-Bressolles (1909 –); m. 2nd in Paris 14 March 1951 Chevalier Jean Albert d'Almont (1909–2003)

Princess Nadejda  divorced in 1940. She died in Chantilly, France in 1988. Her daughters left descendants.

Honours
  House of Romanov: Dame of the Imperial Order of Saint Catherine

Notes

References
Willis, Daniel. The Romanovs in the 21st Century: a genealogical Biography. VDM, 2009. .
Zeepvat, Charlotte. The Camera and the Tsars. Sutton Publishing, 2004. 

1898 births
1988 deaths
Princesses of royal blood (Russia)
Emigrants from the Russian Empire to France